Pagurus armatus, the armed hermit crab or black-eyed hermit crab, is a species of hermit crab found in the eastern Pacific Ocean of the United States and British Columbia, Canada.

Description

The legs, including the claws, have bands of colour, in red, orange and white, and the claws bear short spines on the dorsal surface. The eyestalks are short, but bear large black compound eyes. P. armatus can be told apart from the similar P. ochotensis by the spines on its claws, which in P. ochotensis are replaced by granules. The two species are so similar that they have sometimes been considered members of the same species, but are now generally thought to be two distinct species.

Ecology
P. armatus lives on a variety of substrates, being particularly abundant in sea pen beds, at depths of up to

Type specimen
P. armatus was originally described (under the name Bernhardus armatus) from Puget Sound by James Dwight Dana. The  holotype of P. armatus was lost in the Great Chicago Fire of 1871, and has been replaced with a lectotype.

References

Hermit crabs
Crustaceans of the eastern Pacific Ocean
Crustaceans described in 1851